Swallows are a category of dough-like African staple food made of cooked starchy vegetables and/or grains. Fufu of Western Africa, ugali and nsima of Eastern Africa, and sadza of Southern Africa are examples of swallows.

Types 
 Amala
 Banku
 Cou-cou
 Eba
 Fufu
 Potato fufu
 Pounded yam
 Funge
 Kenkey
 Kokonte
 Nsima
 Sadza
 Tuwo
 Tuwon masara
 Tuwon shinkafa
 Ugali

See also 
 Asida
 Ogi
 Porridge
 Rice cake

References